Johannes Perens (26 September 1906 Kaavi, Torgu Parish (now Saaremaa Parish), Kreis Ösel – 25 December 1941 Ussolye prison camp, Perm Oblast) was an Estonian politician. He was a member of the V Riigikogu.

References

1906 births
1941 deaths
People from Saaremaa Parish
People from Kreis Ösel
Settlers' Party politicians
Patriotic League (Estonia) politicians
Members of the Riigikogu, 1932–1934
Members of the Estonian National Assembly
Members of the Riigivolikogu
Estonian people who died in Soviet detention
People who died in the Gulag